Robert Masters  (15 June 1879 – 29 June 1967) was a New Zealand politician of the Liberal Party, and a cabinet minister.

Biography

Masters was born in 1879. He was defeated by Edward Walter in 1925.

He was appointed to the New Zealand Legislative Council on 11 June 1930 and served for one seven-year term. In the Forbes Ministry, he was a Member of the Executive Council without portfolio (1930–1931). In the United/Reform Coalition, he was Minister of Education (1931–1934), and Minister of Industries and Commerce (1931–1935).

In 1935, Masters was awarded the King George V Silver Jubilee Medal. In the 1953 Coronation Honours, he was appointed a Companion of the Order of St Michael and St George, for public services. He died in 1967.

Notes

References

1879 births
1967 deaths
New Zealand Liberal Party MPs
Members of the Cabinet of New Zealand
Members of the New Zealand Legislative Council
People from Taranaki
New Zealand Liberal Party MLCs
New Zealand education ministers
Members of the New Zealand House of Representatives
New Zealand MPs for North Island electorates
New Zealand Companions of the Order of St Michael and St George
Unsuccessful candidates in the 1925 New Zealand general election